The Ascent of Ethiopia is a 1932 painting by Lois Mailou Jones. This painting depicts the journey of African Americans who have established a heritage built on their trials and tribulations.

History
The Ascent of Ethiopia started Lois Mailou Jones's career. Jones stated in an interview with Charles Rowell that painting was inspired by The Awakening of Ethiopia a sculpted piece by Meta Warrick Fuller. It was painted during the Harlem Renaissance, when Harlem was the peak of black artistic culture. Like many of Jones's paintings, The Ascent of Ethiopia is culturally diverse.

About the painting
In the bottom right corner of the painting is a figure, covering about one quarter of the canvas, wearing a blue and black headdress facing left with a profile view, watching others carry pots on their heads. These silhouette-type figures are gesturing toward a glowing star in the top left corner, or holding hands while looking towards a city in the top right corner. All are moving to an elevated position in the painting, the city in the top right corner is composed of two big buildings where there are two entertainers in front; one is playing the piano while the other seems to be preparing to sing because there are music notes around him. Behind these two big buildings is a big round yellow circular object protruding from the side, surrounded by two blue/turquoise concentric circles. The yellow object has a face, and someone on a bended knee acting on top of it. The bigger turquoise circle has a face coming out towards the inside. Further up is someone painting on top of the blue circle with the words art above enclosed within the blue circle. A palette and brush are painted within that blue circle, the star in the top left corner has rays of squiggly blue, green, and black streaks that radiate diagonally. The star is inside of a yellow circle shining down on the people gesturing towards it.

Sources 

 DeLamotte,C. Eugenia. Instant Moments: Allegory and the Spatial Compression of Time. 26 March 2006
 "Focus on the Slave trade". BBC News  (3 September 2001): 6 April 2006

External links
 An image of the painting

Paintings by Lois Mailou Jones
1932 paintings